= Villa Schmitz =

Coordinates: 43.7217°N 7.2972°E

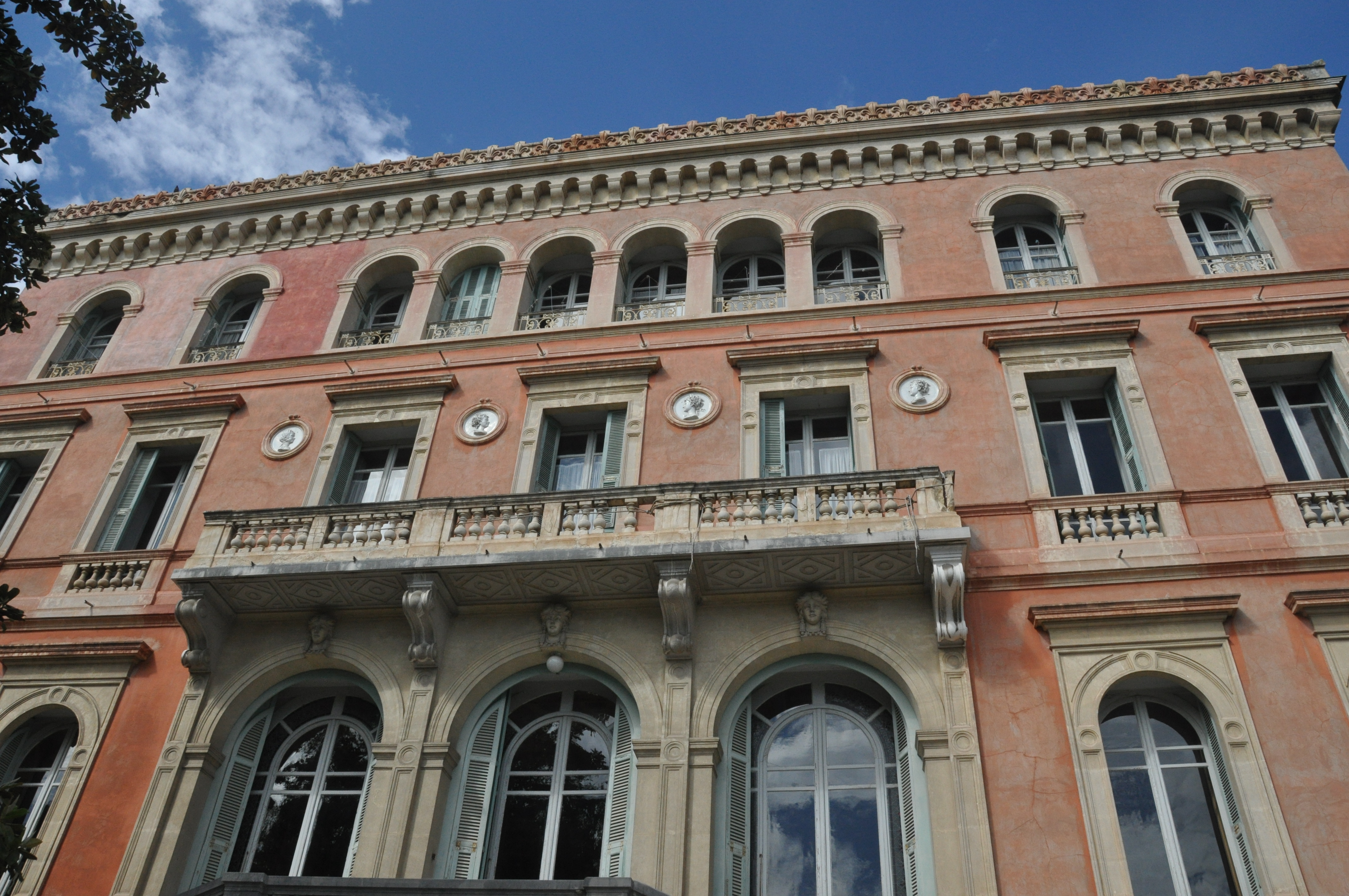
Villa Schmitz Facade

The Villa Schmitz is a historic mansion in Nice, Alpes-Maritimes, France. It was built from 1884 to 1887 for Victoire Schmitz. It was designed by architect Vincent Levrot. It has been listed as an official national monument since October 1, 2010.
